Michael Birkeland (16 December 183024 May 1896) was a Norwegian historian, civil servant and politician. 

He was born at Eigersund in Rogaland, Norway.  In 1855, he was awarded his cand. jur. at the University of Christiania  (now University of Oslo). In 1852, he became an assistant in the National Archives of Norway (Riksarkivet). In 1863, he took over the position of national archivist.

He co-founded the Norwegian Historical Association in 1869, and edited the academic journal Historisk Tidsskrift from 1869 to 1879. He was a member of the Storting from 1880 to 1885. He was decorated Knight of the Order of St. Olav in 1875.

References

External links
 

1830 births
1896 deaths
People from Eigersund
University of Oslo alumni
Norwegian civil servants
19th-century Norwegian historians
Members of the Storting
 Recipients of the St. Olav's Medal
Burials at the Cemetery of Our Saviour